Penicillium dimorphosporum is an anamorph species of the genus of Penicillium.

See also
 List of Penicillium species

References

dimorphosporum
Fungi described in 1970